This is a list of electoral division results for the Australian 1984 federal election in the state of New South Wales.

Overall results

Results by division

Banks

Barton 
 This section is an excerpt from Electoral results for the Division of Barton § 1984

Bennelong 
 This section is an excerpt from Electoral results for the Division of Bennelong § 1984

Berowra 
 This section is an excerpt from Electoral results for the Division of Berowra § 1984

Blaxland 
 This section is an excerpt from Electoral results for the Division of Blaxland § 1984

Bradfield 
 This section is an excerpt from Electoral results for the Division of Bradfield § 1984

Calare 
 This section is an excerpt from Electoral results for the Division of Calare § 1984

Charlton 
 This section is an excerpt from Electoral results for the Division of Charlton § 1984

Chifley 
 This section is an excerpt from Electoral results for the Division of Chifley § 1984

Cook 
 This section is an excerpt from Electoral results for the Division of Cook § 1984

Cowper 
 This section is an excerpt from Electoral results for the Division of Cowper § 1984

Cunningham 
 This section is an excerpt from Electoral results for the Division of Cunningham § 1984

Dobell 
 This section is an excerpt from Electoral results for the Division of Dobell § 1984

Dundas 
 This section is an excerpt from Electoral results for the Division of Dundas § 1984

Eden-Monaro 
 This section is an excerpt from Electoral results for the Division of Eden-Monaro § 1984

Farrer 
 This section is an excerpt from Electoral results for the Division of Farrer § 1984

Fowler 
 This section is an excerpt from Electoral results for the Division of Fowler § 1984

Gilmore 
 This section is an excerpt from Electoral results for the Division of Gilmore § 1984

Grayndler 
 This section is an excerpt from Electoral results for the Division of Grayndler § 1984

Greenway 
 This section is an excerpt from Electoral results for the Division of Greenway § 1984

Gwydir 
 This section is an excerpt from Electoral results for the Division of Gwydir § 1984

Hughes 
 This section is an excerpt from Electoral results for the Division of Hughes § 1984

Hume 
 This section is an excerpt from Electoral results for the Division of Hume § 1984

Hunter 
 This section is an excerpt from Electoral results for the Division of Hunter § 1984

Kingsford Smith 
 This section is an excerpt from Electoral results for the Division of Kingsford Smith § 1984

Lindsay 
 This section is an excerpt from Electoral results for the Division of Lindsay § 1984

Lowe 
 This section is an excerpt from Electoral results for the Division of Lowe § 1984

Lyne 
 This section is an excerpt from Electoral results for the Division of Lyne § 1984

Macarthur 
 This section is an excerpt from Electoral results for the Division of Macarthur § 1984

Mackellar 
 This section is an excerpt from Electoral results for the Division of Mackellar § 1984

Macquarie 
 This section is an excerpt from Electoral results for the Division of Macquarie § 1984

Mitchell 
 This section is an excerpt from Electoral results for the Division of Mitchell § 1984

New England 
 This section is an excerpt from Electoral results for the Division of New England § 1984

Newcastle 
 This section is an excerpt from Electoral results for the Division of Newcastle1984

North Sydney 
 This section is an excerpt from Electoral results for the Division of North Sydney § 1984

Page 
 This section is an excerpt from Electoral results for the Division of Page § 1984

Parkes 
 This section is an excerpt from Electoral results for the Division of Parkes § 1984

Parramatta 
 This section is an excerpt from Electoral results for the Division of Parramatta § 1984

Phillip 
 This section is an excerpt from Electoral results for the Division of Phillip § 1984

Prospect 
 This section is an excerpt from Electoral results for the Division of Prospect § 1984

Reid 
 This section is an excerpt from Electoral results for the Division of Reid § 1984

Richmond 
 This section is an excerpt from Electoral results for the Division of Richmond § 1984

Riverina-Darling 
 This section is an excerpt from Electoral results for the Division of Riverina-Darling § 1984

Robertson 
 This section is an excerpt from Electoral results for the Division of Robertson § 1984

Shortland 
 This section is an excerpt from Electoral results for the Division of Shortland § 1984

St George 
 This section is an excerpt from Electoral results for the Division of St George § 1984

Sydney 
 This section is an excerpt from Electoral results for the Division of Sydney § 1984

Throsby 
 This section is an excerpt from Electoral results for the Division of Throwsby § 1984

Warringah 
 This section is an excerpt from Electoral results for the Division of Warringah § 1984

Wentworth 
 This section is an excerpt from Electoral results for the Division of Wentworth § 1984

Werriwa 
 This section is an excerpt from Electoral results for the Division of Werriwa § 1984

See also 
 Results of the 1984 Australian federal election (House of Representatives)
 Members of the Australian House of Representatives, 1984–1987

References 

New South Wales 1984